Giorgi Samsonis dze Antadze (born 6 September 1920 in Poti; died 3 November 1987 in Tbilisi), was a Georgian and Soviet football player and manager.

Career
Antadze was capped three times for an unofficial Soviet Union representative team. He first appeared under manager Boris Arkadyev, on 14 May 1952, in a friendly unofficial international match, when the Soviet Union beat Poland 2–1. He played his second game on 24 May 1952 in their 1–1 draw with famous Hungarian national team led by legendary Ferenc Puskás, also in a friendly unofficial international match. Both matches were held at the Central Dynamo Stadium in Moscow.

Honours
 Soviet Top League runner-up: 1951, 1953
 Soviet Cup runner-up: 1946

References

External links
 Official FC Dinamo Tbilisi website
 Biographical Dictionary of Georgian Athletes
  Profile at rusteam.permian.ru
  Profile and Statistics at footballfacts.ru

1920 births
1987 deaths
People from Poti
Soviet footballers
Association football midfielders
Footballers from Georgia (country)
Soviet football managers
Soviet Top League players
FC Dinamo Sukhumi players
FC Dinamo Tbilisi players
FC Torpedo Kutaisi managers
Footballers at the 1952 Summer Olympics
Olympic footballers of the Soviet Union
Honoured Masters of Sport of the USSR